Northeast on Fire is the third and final studio album by American go-go band Northeast Groovers. It was released in 1999.

Track listing

Personnel
Christian Black - Lead Vocals
Khari Pratt – bass guitar
Lamond "Maestro" Perkins – keyboards
Ronald "88" Utley – keyboards
Leonard "Daddy-O" Huggins – vocals
Dave "32" Ellis - vocals
Ronald "Dig-Dug" Dixon – vocals, percussions
Larry "Stomp Dogg" Atwater – drummer
Samuel "Smoke" Dews – conga, percussions

References

External links
Northeast on Fire at Discogs

1999 albums
Northeast Groovers albums